Church 2011 is a memorandum promulgated by Catholic theology professors, primarily from Germany, Switzerland and Austria.  The memorandum, whose full German title is Kirche 2011: Ein notwendiger Aufbruch, was started in Germany in January 2011. The memorandum is a general demand for reform of the Roman Catholic Church in response to the sexual abuse scandal among German priests.

Description
The memorandum demands:
 Structures of participation: more participation of all people in the Catholic Church, particularly through election of bishops and priests;
 Parish community: more help for Catholic communities, with a more explicit sharing of responsibilities. Married priests and women as priests should be allowed;
 Legal culture: the Catholic Church should initiate a church jurisdiction;
 Freedom of conscience: respect for individual conscience, particularly for divorced people, who want to marry again, and for homosexual civil unions;
 Reconciliation: greater reconciliation of the church to her own history; and
 Worship: reform of the Roman Catholic liturgy (with greater modern influence, and more influence from the cultural life of countries).

, over 300 Catholic professors, theologians and other religious scientists from across the world had signed the memorandum.

List of signators

German language territory

 Michael Albus, University of Freiburg
 Franz Annen, University of Chur
 Arno Anzenbacher, University of Mainz
 Edmund Arens, University of Lucerne
 Antonio Autiero, University of Munster
 Karl Baier, University of Wien
 Franz-Josef Bäumer, University of Giessen
 Georg Baudler, University of Aachen
 Urs Baumann, University of Tübingen
 Isidor Baumgartner, University of Passau
 Ulrike Bechmann, University of Graz
 Manfred Belok, University of Chur
 Andreas Benk, University of Schwäbisch Gmünd
 Johannes Beutler, University of Frankfurt
 Klaus Bieberstein, University of Bamberg
 Sabine Bieberstein, University of Eicstat
 Albert Biesinger, University of Tübingen
 Franz Xaver Bischof, University of Munich
 Martina Blasberg-Kuhnke, University of Osnabruck
 Thomas Böhm, University of Freiburg
 Michael Böhnke, University of Wuppertal
 Christoph Böttigheimer, University of Eichstätt
 Karl Bopp, University of Benediktbeuern
 Karl-Heinz Braun, University of Freiburg
 Thomas Bremer, University of Munster
 Johannes Brosseder, University of Cologne
 Ingo Broer, University of Siegen
 Anton A. Bucher, University of Salzburg
 Giancarlo Collet, University of Munster
 Gerhard Dautzenberg, University of Gießen
 Sabine Demel, University of Regensburg
 Detlev Dormeyer, University of Dortmund
 Gerhard Droesser, University of Würzburg
 Margit Eckholt, University of Osnabrück
 Peter Eicher, University of Paderborn
 Volker Eid, University of Bamberg
 Bernhard Emunds, University of Frankfurt
 Rudolf Englert, University of Duisburg
 Stephan Ernst, University of Würzburg
 Wolfgang G. Esser, University of Dortmund
 Reinhold Esterbauer, University of Graz
 Heinz-Josef Fabry, University of Bonn
 Ernst Feil, University of Munich
 Reinhard Feiter, University of Munster
 Michael Felder, University of Freiburg in Uechtland
 Rupert Feneberg, University of Weingarten
 Hubert Frankemölle, University of Paderborn
 Albert Franz, University of Dresden
 Christian Frevel, University of Cologne
 Edward Fröhling, University of Vallendar
 Ottmar Fuchs, University of Tübingen
 Alfons Fürst, University of Munster
 Ingeborg Gabriel, University of Wien
 Karl Gabriel, University of Munster
 Erich Garhammer, University of Würzburg
 Albert Gasser, University of Chur
 Martin Gertler, University of Cologne
 Reinhard Göllner, University of Bochum
 Stephan Goertz, University of Mainz
 Heinz-Jürgen Görtz, University of Hannover
 Norbert Greinacher, University of Tübingen
 Franz Gruber, University of Linz
 Bernhard Grümme, University of Ludwigsburg
 Wilhelm Guggenberger, University of Innsbruck
 Gerd Häfner, University of Munich
 Hille Haker, University of Frankfurt am Main
 Hubertus Halbfas, University of Reutlingen
 Hans Halter, University of Luzern
 Richard Hartmann, University of Fulda
 Linus Hauser, University of Gießen
 Christoph Heil, University of Graz
 Marianne Heimbach-Steins, University of Bamberg
 Theresia Heimerl, University of Graz
 Hanspeter Heinz, University of Augsburg
 Ulrich Hemel, University of Regensburg
 Friedhelm Hengsbach, University of Sankt Georgen
 Bernd Jochen Hilberath, University of Tübingen
 Georg Hilger, University of Regensburg
 Konrad Hilpert, University of Munich
 Hans Gerald Hödl, University of Wien
 Rudolf Höfer, University of Graz
 Hans-Joachim Höhn, University of Cologne
 Johannes Hoffmann, University of Frankfurt
 Paul Hoffmann, University of Bamberg
 Adrian Holderegger, University of Freiburg im Uechtland
 Andreas Holzem, University of Tübingen
 Reinhard Hübner, University of Munich
 Peter Hünermann, University of Tübingen
 Hubert Irsigler, University of Freiburg
 Martin Jäggle, University of Wien
 Bernhard Jendorff, University of Kassel
 Hans Jorissen, University of Bonn
 Christina Kalloch, University of Hannover
 Rainer Kampling, University of Berlin
 Leo Karrer, University of Freiburg im Uechtland
 Othmar Keel, University of Freiburg im Uechtland
 Walter Kern, University of Ludwigsburg
 Hans Kessler, University of Frankfurt am Main
 Klaus Kienzler, University of Augsburg
 Klaus Kießling, University of Frankfurt am Main
 Walter Kirchschläger, University of Luzern
 Stephanie B. Klein, University of Salzburg
 Stefan Knobloch, University of Mainz
 Joachim Köhler, University of Tübingen
 Judith Könemann, University of Münster
 Helga Kohler-Spiegel, University of Voralberg
 Anton Kolb, University of Graz
 Roland Kollmann, University of Dortmund
 Wilhelm Korff, University of Tübingen
 Elmar Kos, University of Vechta
 Georg Kraus, University of Bamberg
 Gerhard Kruip, University of Mainz
 Max Küchler, University of Freiburg im Uechtland
 Joachim Kügler, University of Bamberg
 Roman Kühschelm, University of Wien
 Hans Küng, University of Tübingen
 Karl-Christoph Kuhn, University of Tübingen
 Ulrich Kuhnke, University of Osnabruck
 Lothar Kuld, University of Weingarten
 Karl-Josef Kuschel, University of Tübingen
 Raimund Lachner, University of Vechta
 Karl Heinz Ladenhauf, University of Graz
 Anton Landersdorfer, University of Passau
 Bernhard Lang, University of Paderborn
 Georg Langenhorst, University of Augsburg
 Wolfgang Langer, University of Wien
 Rudolf Langthaler, University of Wien
 Gerhard Larcher, University of Graz
 Karl Josef Lesch, University of Vechta
 Ernst Leuninger, University of Vallendar
 Maximilian Liebmann, University of Graz
 Winfried Löffler, University of Innsbruck
 Adrian Loretan, University of Luzern
 Klaus Lüdicke, University of Munster
 Heiner Ludwig, University of Darmstadt
 Hubertus Lutterbach, University of Essen
 Joachim Maier, University of Heidelberg
 , University of Mainz
 Hans Mendl, University of Passau
 Friedhelm Mennekes, University of Sankt Georgen
 Karl-Wilhelm Merks, University of Tilburg, Netherlands
 Norbert Mette, University of Dortmund
 Guido Meyer University of Aachen
 Andreas Michel, University of Cologne
 Anja Middelbeck-Varwick, University of Berlin
 Dietmar Mieth, University of Tübingen
 Heinrich Missalla, University of Essen
 Matthias Möhring-Hesse, University of Vechta
 Hilary Mooney, University of Weingarten
 Klaus Müller, University of Munster
 Ilse Müllner, University of Kassel
 Doris Nauer, University of Vallendar
 Peter Neuner, University of Munich
 Monika Nickel, University of Passau
 Heribert Niederschlag, University of Vallendar
 Christoph Niemand, University of Linz
 Franz-Josef Nocke, University of Essen
 Andreas Odenthal, University of Tübingen
 Karl-Heinz Ohlig, University of Saarbrücken
 Hans-Ludwig Ollig, University of Frankfurt am Main
 Wolfgang Palaver, University of Innsbruck
 Silvia Pellegrini, University of Vechta
 Sabine Pemsel-Maier, University of Karlsruhe
 Otto Hermann Pesch, University of Hamburg
 Johann Pock, University of Wien
 Uta Poplutz, University of Wuppertal
 Burkard Porzelt, University of Regensburg
 Thomas Pröpper, University of Munster
 Gunter Prüller-Jagenteufel, University of Wien
 Walter Raberger, University of Linz
 Michael Raske, University of Frankfurt
 Johann Reikerstorfer, University of Wien
 Elisabeth Reil, University of Konstanz
 Helmut Renöckl, University of Linz
 Eleonore Reuter, University of Mainz
 Klemens Richter, University of Munster
 Bert Roebben, University of Dortmund
 Eberhard Rolinck, University of Munster
 Hans Rotter, University of Innsbruck
 Karlheinz Ruhstorfer, University of Koblenz
 Gerhard A. Rummel, University of Freiburg
 Ralph Sauer, University of Vechta
 Sabine Schäper, University of Munster
 Mirjam Schambeck, University of Bamberg
 Matthias Scharer, University of Innsbruck
 Monika Scheidler, University of Dresden
 Hans Schelkshorn, University of Wien
 Karl Schlemmer, University of Passau
 Udo Schmälzle, University of Munster
 Bruno Schmid, University of Weingarten
 Heinrich Schmidinger, University of Salzburg
 Thomas M. Schmidt, University of Frankfurt
 Joachim Schmiedl, University of Vallendar
 Eberhard Schockenhoff, University of Freiburg
 Norbert Scholl, University of Heidelberg
 Michael Schramm, University of Hohenheim
 Stefan Schreiber, University of Augsburg
 Thomas Schreijäck, University of Frankfurt
 Thomas Schüller, University of Munster
 Helen Schüngel-Straumann, University of Cologne
 Ehrenfried Schulz, University of Munich
 Hans Reinhard Seeliger, University of Tübingen
 Josef Senft, University of Cologne
 Roman A. Siebenrock, University of Innsbruck
 Hermann Pius Siller, University of Frankfurt am Main
 Werner Simon, University of Mainz
 Egon Spiegel, University of Vechta
 Hermann Steinkamp, University of Munster
 Georg Steins, University of Osnabruck
 Hermann Stenger, University of Innsbruck
 Hermann-Josef Stipp, University of Munich
 Klaus von Stosch, University of Paderborn
 Magnus Striet, University of Freiburg
 Angelika Strotmann, University of Paderborn
 Joachim Theis, University of Trier
 Michael Theobald, University of Tübingen
 Franz Trautmann, University of Schwäbisch-Gmünd
 Maria Trautmann, University of Eichstätt
 Wolfgang Treitler, University of Wien
 Bernd Trocholepczy, University of Frankfurt am Main
 Peter Trummer, University of Graz
 Hermann-Josef Venetz, University of Freiburg im Uechtland
 Markus Vogt, University of Munich
 Marie-Theres Wacker, University of Munster
 Heribert Wahl, University of Trier
 Peter Walter, University of Mainz
 Franz Weber, University of Innsbruck
 Wolfgang Weirer, University of Graz
 Saskia Wendel, University of Cologne
 Knut Wenzel, University of Frankfurt am Main
 Ludwig Wenzler, University of Freiburg
 Jürgen Werbick, University of Munster
 Christian Wessely, University of Graz
 Dietrich Wiederkehr, University of Luzern
 Annette Wilke, University of Munster
 Ulrich Willers, University of Eichstätt
 Werner Wolbert, University of Salzburg
 Martha Zechmeister, University of Passau
 Hans-Georg Ziebertz, University of Würzburg
 Reinhold Zwick, University of Munster

Professors, theologians and other religious scientists from non-German speaking countries

 Xavier Alegre (El Salvador)
 Olaizola Arregi (Spain)
 Jesús Asurmendi (France)
 Gregory Baum (Canada)
 José Manuel Bernal Cantos (Spain)
 José Bernardi (Brazil)
 Ignace Berten (Belgium)
 Montserrat Biosca Duch (Spain)
 Alberto Bondolfi (Switzerland)
 Eberhard Bons (France)
 Sánchez Castillo (Spain)
 José Centeno (Spain)
 Aldir Crocoli (Brasil)
 Ton Danenberg (Philippines)
 Juan Antonio Estrada (Spain)
 Marcio Fabri (Brazil)
 Rufo Fernández Pérez (Spain)
 Dolores Figueras Fondevila (Spain)
 Bejamin Forcano Cebollada (Spain)
 Judette Gallares (Spain)
 Máximo Garcia Ruiz (Spain)
 Marcelo Juan González (Argentina)
 Jan Jans (Belgium)
 Werner G. Jeanrond (United Kingdom)
 Miro Jelecevic (Bosnia and Herzegovina)
 Elisa Jiménez Xifre (Spain)
 Janez Juhant (Slovenia)
 Walter Lesch (France)
 Julio Lois Fernández (Spain)
 Aloysius Lopez Cartagenas (Philippines)
 Ivo Markovic (Bosnia and Herzegovina)
 Juan Masia Clavel (Spain))
 José Mario Méndez Méndez (Costa Rica)
 Anthony T. Padovano (United States)
 José Antonio Pagola Elorza (Spain)
 Luis Augusto Panchi (Ecuador)
 Federico Pastor Ramos (Spain)
 Jesús Peláez del Rosal (Spain)
 Richard Penaskovic (United States)
 Margarita Pintos de Cea-Naharro (Spain)
 Félix Placer Ugarte (Spain)
 John Mansford Prior (Indonesia)
 Julio Puente López (Spain)
 Mertxe Renovales (Spain)
 Susan Roll (Canada)
 Giuseppe Ruggieri (Italy)
 José Sánchez (Mexico)
 Torrado Sánchez (Spain)
 Joseph Selling (Belgium)
 Thomas Shannon (United States)
 Jon Sobrino (El Salvador)
 Jacqui Stewart (United Kingdom)
 Silvana Suaiden (Brasil)
 Luiz Carlos Susin (Brasil)
 Paulo Suess (Brasil)
 Juan José Tamayo Acosta (Spain)
 Marie-Jo Thiel (France)
 Christoph Theobald (France)
 Andrés Torres Queiruga (Spain)
 Caroline Vander Stichele (Netherlands)
 Rufino Velasco Martinez (Spain)
 Marciano Vidal Garcia (Spain)
 Evaristo Villar Villar (Spain)
 Javier Vitoria (Spain)
 Lode Lucas Wostyn (Philippines)
 Juan Yzuel (Spain)
 Marta Zubia (Guinea)

See also
Roman Catholic sex abuse cases by country#Germany

References

External links 
 Kirche 2011:Ein notwendiger Aufbruch (in German)
 Church 2011: The Need for a New Beginning (Text of memorandum in English)
 Süddeutsche:Reform von innen (German)
 Frankfurter Rundschau:Die Kirche steht sich selbst im Weg (German)
 NZZ:Im Wellengang der Zeiten

20th-century Christian texts
2011 documents
Catholicism-related controversies
Memoranda
Ordination of women and the Catholic Church
LGBT and Catholicism
Dissident Roman Catholic theologians
Criticism of the Catholic Church
Catholic Church in Germany